The electoral district of Footscray is an electoral district of the Victorian Legislative Assembly. It lies just north of Melbourne, covering the suburbs of Footscray, Maidstone, Maribyrnong, Seddon, West Footscray, and parts of Yarraville.

The seat was first created by The Electoral Act Amendment Act 1876 taking effect at the 1877 elections. It was abolished in 1904 and recreated in 1927.  In its current incarnation it has been held by the Labor Party for its entire existence. It has usually been a comfortably safe Labor seat, as it lies in Labor's traditional heartland of western and northern Melbourne.

Members for Footscray

Election results

Graphical summary

External links
 Electorate profile: Footscray District, Victorian Electoral Commission

References

Electoral districts of Victoria (Australia)
1877 establishments in Australia
1904 disestablishments in Australia
1927 establishments in Australia
City of Maribyrnong
Electoral districts and divisions of Greater Melbourne